Georges Jacquot (born in Nancy in 1794 – died in Paris in 1874) was a French sculptor.

Biography
He was a pupil of Baron Gros and sculptor François Joseph Bosio. In 1820, he won the Grand Prix de Rome for sculpture with a statue named Caïn maudit, entendant la voix de l'Éternel.

Bibliography
 Jeune nymphe descendant dans l'eau, marble, statue, Paris, musée du Louvre
 Cariatide, Paris, palais du Louvre, pavillon Denon
 Jeune triton chevauchant sur un dauphin, group, bronze, Paris, fontaine Gaillon, place Gaillon
 Stanislas Ist, 1831, statue, bronze, Nancy, place Stanislas

References

Bibliography
 Pierre Kjellberg, Le Nouveau guide des statues de Paris, La Bibliothèque des Arts, Paris, 1988
 Emmanuel Schwartz, Les Sculptures de l'École des Beaux-Arts de Paris. Histoire, doctrines, catalogue, École nationale supérieure des Beaux-Arts, Paris, 2003

External links
 Works by Jacquot, on Base Joconde

1794 births
1874 deaths
19th-century French sculptors
French male sculptors
Artists from Nancy, France
Prix de Rome for sculpture
Pupils of Antoine-Jean Gros
19th-century French male artists